Eric Lau is a British music producer and DJ from London, England. His production style is characterized by heavy drums, often unrecognisable samples and a mixture of live and sequenced instrumentation.

Career
Lau first gained exposure with the song "Im Fine" featuring Rahel on Gilles Peterson's Brownswood Bubblers (Part 4), this release marked the resurgence of the stripped back soul style and was followed swiftly by his debut EP for Fat City Records.

He released his debut album "New Territories" in 2008 on Ubiquity Records to critical acclaim. Straight No Chaser wrote "New Territories represents the arrival of a talented artist and perceptive one-man production house."

After a two-year absence Lau returned in 2010 with a new EP titled "Kilawatt: V2", as the second instalment of the producer series released by Kilawatt. The release was received positively by both critics and fans.

On 27 September 2010, Lau released a 20-track instrumental LP entitled "Makin' Sound".

In February 2011, Lau followed up "Makin' Sound" with "Quadrivium", another 20-track instrumental project, featuring music inspired by the John Martineau book of the same name.

In November 2011, Lau released "The Mission - Single" with Detroit rapper Guilty Simpson and Georgia Anne Muldrow contributing a remix.

On 3 February 2012, Lau released the much anticipated "The Mission - EP", featuring vocals from rapper Guilty Simpson, Fatima and Olivier Daysoul. The vinyl edition of the release also featured contributions from drummer Chris "Daddy" Dave, and producer Damu The Fudgemunk.

Discography

Studio albums
 New Territories (2008)
Makin' Sound (2010)
Quadrivium (2011)
 One of Many (2013)

EPs and singles
 Presents Dudley And Friends (2006)
 Producer No. 1 (2007)
 Kilawatt V2 (2010)
 The Mission - EP (2012)
 "What I'd Rather" - Single (2012)
 "Everytime" (feat. Rahel) - Single (2013)

References

External links
Kilawatt Music's Web Site
Ubiquity Records Web Site

English hip hop musicians
British DJs
Living people
Ubiquity Records artists
1981 births